John Campbell was a Scottish footballer who played for South Western and Scotland. He also played for and was match secretary of Rangers.

References

External links

London Hearts profile

Year of birth missing
Year of death missing
Rangers F.C. players
Scottish footballers
Scotland international footballers
Association football wingers
Place of birth missing
Place of death missing
South Western F.C. players